Chimarrichthys is a genus of fish in the family Sisoridae endemic to China.

Species
There are currently 4 recognized species in this genus:
 Chimarrichthys davidi Sauvage, 1874 
 Chimarrichthys kishinouyei (Sh. Kimura, 1934) 
 Chimarrichthys longibarbatus (W. Zhou, X. Li & A. W. Thomson, 2011) 
 Chimarrichthys longus (W. Zhou, X. Li & A. W. Thomson, 2011)

References

Catfish genera
Freshwater fish genera
Sisoridae
Taxa named by Henri Émile Sauvage